Intoxifornication is the second album by Gregg Alexander, released on May 5, 1992.

It includes three tracks ("Loving You Sets Me Free",  "Cruel With Me" and "The World We Love So Much") that had already been released on Alexander's 1989 debut album Michigan Rain. It also includes rerecordings of "Michigan Rain" and "Save Me From Myself" from that album.

Both "Smokin' In Bed" and "The Truth" were released as one-track promotional singles, and had videos filmed.

"The Truth" includes the line "Here it comes, here it comes, here it comes/Are you ready?/Here comes the lawsuit, baby", followed by Alexander covering the refrain of "Slow Ride" by Foghat. There is also a reference to the "Tutti Frutti" line "A wop-bom a loo-mop".

Track listing
All songs written by Gregg Alexander.
 "Smokin' in Bed" – 3:11
 "Michigan Rain" – 2:50
 "Loving You Sets Me Free" – 4:23
 "Intoxifornication" – 4:02
 "The Truth" – 5:13
 "Save Me from Myself" – 6:22
 "I Wanna Seduce You" – 3:13
 "Electric Girlfriend" – 2:25
 "Cruel with Me" – 4:02
 "The World We Love So Much" – 4:38
 "Wear Your Love Beside You" (hidden track, title listed on Japanese release) – 4:31

Personnel
 Gregg Alexander - vocals, lead guitar, solos, electric and acoustic rhythm guitars
 Danielle Brisebois - backing vocals
 N'Dea Davenport - additional vocals
 Denny Fongheiser - drums
 Laura Harding - additional vocals
 David Munday - additional vocals
 John Pierce - bass guitar
 Rick Nowels - electric guitar, keyboards, piano and bass, additional vocals
 Rudy Richman - drums
 Ben Schultz - lead and rhythm guitars
 Robbie Seidman - additional vocals
 Sandy Stewart - additional vocals
 Maria Vidal - additional vocals

References

External links
 Full album audio stream at imeem
 "Slow Ride" lyrics and audio clip at Foghat's official homepage
 NewRadicals.Us. Unofficial forum covering New Radicals, Gregg Alexander and Danielle Brisebois.

Gregg Alexander albums
1992 albums
Albums produced by Rick Nowels
Epic Records albums